Alfa Romeo 902A is a bus produced by Alfa Romeo between 1957 and 1959.

Technical characteristics
The bus used a body built by Sicca and had an Alfa Romeo 1606 engine with 130 hp. It also had two wheelbases at a length of 11 m. Featuring two doors, it provided space for 40 passengers. The engine used diesel as fuel.

Versions
 Alfa Romeo 902AU
 Alfa Romeo 902AS

Transport
The 902A was used in the ATM system in Milan

Production
58 vehicles were produced of this type.

See also
 List of buses

References

902A
Buses articles needing expert attention